Cronk ny Merriu is one of the remains of promontory forts in the Isle of Man. Close to Port Grenaugh, this site dates back almost 2,000 years. The bank and ditch of Iron Age date created a defensive promontory fort at Cronk ny Merriu. Later, a rectangular building of Norse style and layout stood here, part of a system of coastal lookout posts.

Several of the lookout posts, especially in Santon, where Cronk ny Merriu is situated, can be visited using the coastal footpath. All of the posts have a rampart on their vulnerable landward side, and excavations have shown that access to the fort was via a strongly built gate.

The Scandinavians who arrived in Mann in the eighth and ninth centuries sometimes re-used these Iron Age promontory forts, often obliterating the old domestic quarters with their characteristic rectangular houses; the fine example at Cronk ny Merriu has been used as the basis of the reconstruction in the House of Manannan.

Etymology
In the Manx language  (hill)  (the dead) means literally 'hill of the dead'.

Hill forts in the Isle of Man
Historic sites in the Isle of Man
Tourist attractions in the Isle of Man
History of the Isle of Man